Malva ludwigii (syn. Althaea ludwigii) is a widespread species of flowering plant in the family Malvaceae. It is native to northern Africa, the Middle East, central Asia, and India, and disjunctly to Namibia and South Africa. A desert-adapted annual, it is also somewhat weedy, being found in cultivated land and on roadsides.

References

ludwigii
Flora of Mauritania
Flora of North Africa
Flora of Sinai
Flora of Palestine (region)
Flora of Lebanon
Flora of Iraq
Flora of Kuwait
Flora of Saudi Arabia
Flora of Oman
Flora of Iran
Flora of Turkmenistan
Flora of Uzbekistan
Flora of Tajikistan
Flora of Afghanistan
Flora of Pakistan
Flora of India
Flora of Namibia
Flora of the Cape Provinces
Plants described in 2011